() was a Spanish term for various types of fabrics or fabric products in the Middle Ages.  was derived from the Arabic term , that signified heavy cotton and woolen materials. Initially meaning a heavy cloth, by the 15th century it had come to mean a luxurious cloth made of silk. In the 17th century, the term was revived to mean a twill weave woolen material similar to moleskin.

See also 

 Fustian
 Almerían silk

References 

Woven fabrics